is a 2016 Japanese comedy film directed by Daigo Matsui. It critiques sexism in Japan through the story of a young woman.

Cast 
 Yū Aoi - Haruko Azumi
 Mitsuki Takahata - Aina
 Taiga - Yukio
 Shono Hayama - Manabu
 Huey Ishizaki - Yuji Soga
 Akiko Kikuchi

References

External links 

2016 comedy films
2010s Japanese films